Taren Valdis Sullivan (born July 30, 1995) is an American professional basketball player. He played college basketball for the Findlay Oilers in the NCAA Division II, before turning professional in 2019. He is a 6 ft 6 in (1.98 m) tall small forward.

Early life 
Sullivan played baseball and basketball as a kid, and decided to pursue basketball because he thought it would give him the best chance to play college. He played since he was in second grade at Bath High School.

College career 
Sullivan received a scholarship from the Findlay Oilers, where he played for four years and left with a bachelor's degree in strength and conditioning. In his final season, he averaged 17.2 points on 53% from the field, 6 rebounds and 3.2 assists.

Professional career 
He went undrafted in the 2018 NBA draft but signed with the Sacramento Kings later; however, he was waived again quickly. performing well at the NBA G League Invitatitional in August 2018, Sullivan started his pro career with the Stockton Kings of the NBA G League in 2018. 

After one season with the Kings, he was traded to the Erie BayHawks. Before the season was ended due to the coronavirus pandemic he averaged 7.7 points and 4 rebounds per game. 

In May 2021, Sullivan joined the Nigerian Rivers Hoopers for the inaugural season of the Basketball Africa League (BAL). He averaged 14.3 points in three games that were all lost, as the Hoopers were eliminated in the group stage. 

On July 30, 2021, he signed with Artland Dragons of the German second-level ProA. He averaged 10.9 points and 3.6 rebounds over the season.

On July 23, 2022, Sullivan signed with Dutch team Landstede Hammers of the BNXT League. On August 3, the Hammers announced that the deal with Sullivan fell through and he would not join the team.

BAL career statistics 

|-
| style="text-align:left;"|2021
| style="text-align:left;"|Rivers Hoopers
| 3 || 3 || 26.3 || .410 || .267 || .778 || 3.3 || 1.3 || 1.3 || .0 || 14.3
|-

References

American men's basketball players
1995 births
Living people
Artland Dragons players
Erie BayHawks (2017–2019) players
Findlay Oilers basketball
Findlay Oilers players
Rivers Hoopers players
Small forwards
Stockton Kings players